"Springfield Up" is the thirteenth episode of the eighteenth season of the American animated television series The Simpsons. It originally aired on the Fox network in the United States on February 18, 2007. In the episode, filmmaker Declan Desmond (Eric Idle) returns to Springfield to film the continuation of his documentary series Growing Up Springfield, which chronicles the lives of several Springfield residents. He visits the town with a film crew every eight years to see how the lives of these people have changed, a plot which parodies the Up documentary series.

"Springfield Up" has received generally positive reviews from critics.

Plot
Eccentric documentary filmmaker Declan Desmond offers an inside look at his documentary, Growing Up Springfield. His film follows the lives of several Springfield residents, returning to them after eight-year intervals to examine how their lives have changed.

Particularly featured is Homer, who had wanted to be rich as a child, started a family as an adult, and now lives in an enormous mansion. He explains that he became a success after creating a pen that dispenses condiments. As Desmond is interviewing Marge, Mr. Burns arrives; the mansion is his summer home, and he did not give them permission to use it. He has Smithers release attack dogs on the family to chase them away, although he has to go back to Mr. Burns' other home to collect them first and then release them. Desmond follows Homer to try and humiliate him after pretending to be rich, despite Homer admitting to the camera that he had wanted to be the cool person in Declan's documentary. He'd realized that he was only in the documentary to make everyone else look good (before walking away), Desmond tries to end the scene with the words "Strong words from a dumpy man" and that he was indeed only in the program to make everyone else look good before trying to cut the camera. Marge then angrily makes sure that the camera is still filming and speaks to Desmond, telling him that Homer went through a lot of trouble to impress him and that Homer truly is a successful person, she also said that it was a mistake to let him intrude on their lives before slamming the door on him.

Feeling sorry for Homer, while drinking in Moe's Desmond speaks to Moe telling him that had he been wrong to judge Homer. Moe tells him that he was wrong to judge Homer as he was married to Marge, had three children, a job and his own home. Desmond produces a compilation of people saying good things about him. When Homer watches it, he realizes that spending time with his family and friends has made him truly happy. Nevertheless, Homer pledges that, by the next Growing Up Springfield film in eight years, he will be a world-famous rock star, and then he and Desmond sing a duet of a song Homer wrote called “Satan You're My Lady” as an exasperated Marge looks on.

Production

The episode was written by Matt Warburton and directed by Chuck Sheetz. It is based on Michael Apted's Up Series, a British documentary series that had followed the lives of 14 British children from 1964 to 2019, from when they were seven years old, and returned every seven years to document their lives up until Apted's death in January 2021. English comedian Eric Idle guest starred in the episode as documentary filmmaker Declan Desmond. Idle played Declan in two earlier episodes, 'Scuse Me While I Miss the Sky" (2003) and "Fat Man and Little Boy" (2004).

Reception
"Springfield Up" originally aired on the Fox network in the United States on February 18, 2007.

The episode has received generally positive reviews from critics.

Robert Canning on IGN named it as one of the three "outstanding" episodes of the eighteenth season. He gave it an 8.5/10 rating and commented that it was "by far one of the best Simpsons episodes from the past few seasons. Jokes and gags came fast and furious, all while telling a great story in a cleverly unconventional way," and added that "At its core, 'Springfield Up' was a simple story about Homer feeling the need to impress the snooty British documentarian, but then realizing his life wasn't as bad as he thought. It's a tale we've seen on The Simpsons time and again, but the fresh twist of having it presented within Desmond's documentary made it very memorable."

TV Squad's Adam Finley wrote: "I didn't love it, and I didn't hate it — for the most part, this week's episode was 'just okay' in my opinion. It was nice to see Eric Idle return [...], but the episode felt like two different episodes battling for the same thirty-minute space. [...] In this episode we spend a lot of time learning about those who grew up in Springfield, but Homer's story is also wedged into the mix — it seems the episode should have just been about Homer feeling depressed about his life, or a lighter episode focusing on all the resident of Springfield. I'm not saying the episode was a complete write off, because I think it was still funny, just a little thinner than I come to expect from this series."

References

External links 

The Simpsons (season 18) episodes
2007 American television episodes